Zhordania, also transliterated as Jordania, is a surname of Georgian origin. Notable people with the surname include:

Joseph Jordania (born 1954), Georgian-Australian ethnomusicologist and professor
Levan Jordania (born 1997), Georgian footballer
Merab Jordania (born 1965), Georgian footballer, manager, and owner
Noe Zhordania (1868—1953), Georgian journalist and politician
Tedo Zhordania (1854–1916), Georgian historian, philologist, and educator
Vakhtang Jordania (1943–2005), Georgian conductor

Georgian-language surnames